Shefali Shah is an Indian actress of film, television, theatre and web series who mostly appears in independent Hindi films. She has received several accolades, including a National Film Award, two Filmfare Awards, two Screen Awards, and an Asian Academy Creative Award.

Filmfare Awards

National Film Awards

Screen Awards

Stardust Awards

Zee Cine Awards

Other Awards

References

External links 
 

Lists of awards received by Indian actor